Michele Simon (born 1965) is a public health lawyer who has been researching and writing about food policy since 1996. Her work has been featured on CNBC, CBS News, The New York Times, San Francisco Chronicle, Chicago Tribune, Reuters, and Forbes. She has written extensively on the politics of food, and her book, Appetite for Profit: How the Food Industry Undermines Our Health and How to Fight Back, was published by Nation Books in 2006. Simon has also written extensively about alcohol policy.

Biography 
Simon studied biology at Carnegie Mellon University and received her master's degree in public health from Yale University and her law degree from the University of California, Hastings College of the Law. Early in her career, Simon wrote about the politics of food for numerous publications, on such issues as genetically engineered foods, organic standards, and the National School Lunch Program.

In 2000, Simon founded the non-profit organization, Center for Informed Food Choices to educate people about eating plant-based foods and the politics of food through her newsletter, Informed Eating.

From 2007 to 2011, Simon served as research and policy director for the Marin Institute (now called Alcohol Justice), an alcohol industry watchdog group based in Northern California. Simon testified before Congress in support of HR 5034, the Comprehensive Alcohol Regulatory Enforcement Act. Her 2007 report on alcoholic energy drinks led to federal action to ban the products.

Simon founded Eat Drink Politics in 2011, a food and alcohol industry watchdog consulting firm that helps advocates, policymakers, and others counter corporate tactics that undermine public health. The firm's clients have included Center for Food Safety, Corporate Accountability International, and the Richman Law Group. Simon currently serves as a senior advisor for the Campaign for a Commercial-Free Childhood.

In 2013, Simon was awarded the National Association of Nutrition Professional's Community Award and the Nutritional Therapy Association's Award of Excellence.

In 2016, Simon founded the Plant Based Foods Association (PBFA), a trade association representing the plant-based foods industry. Simon currently serves as its executive director. As PBFA's executive director, Simon advances policies and practices to promote plant-based foods.

Work

Writing 

Simon's first book, Appetite for Profit: How the Food Industry Undermines Our Health and How to Fight Back, was published by Nation Books in 2006.

Simon has contributed to various outlets such as The Huffington Post, Grist, Food Safety News, and Al Jazeera America.

Simon has authored numerous articles in academic journals, including the City University of New York Law Review, Food and Drug Law Journal, Duke Law Journal, and the Loyola of Los Angeles Law Review.

Simon has also published major reports exposing the food and alcohol industries' negative practices. Her 2007 report on alcoholic energy drinks led to federal action to ban the products. Simon's "Food Stamps, Follow the Money" report on food stamps brought attention to industry lobbying. "And Now a Word from Our Sponsors", covered by the New York Times, highlighted corporate sponsorships in the Academy of Nutrition and Dietetics.

 Speaking 

Simon has appeared on national TV stations such as CNN, CBS, MSNBC, CNBC, and Al Jazeera, as well as local news programs. She has been quoted in newspapers such as the New York Times, USA Today'', and ABC News.

Simon has lectured at New York University, Yale University, Stanford University, and Massachusetts Institute of Technology. She taught semester-long courses in health policy as an adjunct professor at the University of California, Hastings College of the Law, alcohol policy at the University of California, Berkeley, and The Politics of Food at the University of the Pacific master's program in Food Studies.

She has spoken at events hosted by the Government Accountability Project's Food Integrity Campaign, the Nutritional Therapy Association, the Campaign for a Commercial-Free Childhood Consuming Kids Summit, and the National Conference to End Factory Farming.

Simon has also spoken at numerous events to discuss the plant-based foods industry, including the Natural Products Expo, the Seed, Food and Wine Festival, and the Animal Law Conference.

Personal 

Simon was raised in New York City and lives in Los Angeles, California, with her partner, film and television actor Ross Turner.

See also 
 Marion Nestle
 Anna Lappe
 Raj Patel
 Michael Pollan
 Mark Bittman

References

External links 

 
Michele Simon on Plant-Based Entrepreneur

1965 births
Living people
American food writers
Writers from New York City
Women food writers
Yale School of Public Health alumni
Carnegie Mellon University alumni